Bobbin lace is a lace textile made by braiding and twisting lengths of thread, which are wound on bobbins to manage them. As the work progresses, the weaving is held in place with pins set in a lace pillow, the placement of the pins usually determined by a pattern or pricking pinned on the pillow.

Bobbin lace is also known as pillow lace, because it was worked on a pillow, and bone lace, because early bobbins were made of bone or ivory.

Bobbin lace is one of the two major categories of handmade laces, the other being needle lace, derived from earlier cutwork and reticella.

Origin

A will of 1493 by the Milanese Sforza family mentions lace created with twelve bobbins. There are two books that represent the early known pattern descriptions for bobbin lace, Le Pompe from Venice and Nüw Modelbuch from Zürich.

Bobbin lace evolved from passementerie or braid-making in 16th-century Italy. Genoa was famous for its braids, hence it is not surprising to find bobbin lace developed in the city. It traveled along with the Spanish troops through Europe. Coarse passements of gold and silver-wrapped threads or colored silks gradually became finer, and later bleached linen yarn was used to make both braids and edgings.

The making of bobbin lace was easier to learn than the elaborate cutwork of the 16th century, and the tools and materials for making linen bobbin lace were inexpensive.  There was a ready market for bobbin lace of all qualities, and women throughout Europe soon took up the craft which earned a better income than spinning, sewing, weaving or other home-based textile arts.  Bobbin lace-making was established in charity schools, almshouses, and convents.

In the 17th century, the textile centers of Flanders and Normandy eclipsed Italy as the premiere sources for fine bobbin lace, but until the coming of mechanization hand-lacemaking continued to be practiced throughout Europe, suffering only in those periods of simplicity when lace itself fell out of fashion.

Some skilled lace makers work to re-create older lace patterns based on the period portraiture and extant lace samples. On paintings that have sufficient detail, entire pieces can be reconstructed by lacemakers who understand the early structural techniques and details.

Materials 
Bobbin lace may be made with coarse or fine threads. Traditionally it was made with linen, silk, wool, or, later, cotton threads, or with precious metals. Today it is made with a variety of natural and synthetic fibers and with wire and other filaments. Even bobbin lace made from human hair, was once popular as a personal momento.

Structure
Elements of bobbin lace may include toile or toilé (clothwork), réseau (the net-like ground of continuous lace), fillings of part laces, tapes, gimp, picots, tallies, ribs and rolls. Not all styles of bobbin lace include all these elements.

Traditional types
 
Many styles of lace were made in the heyday of lacemaking (approximately the 16th–18th centuries) before machine-made lace became available.

 Classification of traditional styles by technique
 Continuous bobbin lace also known as: straight lace or fil continu.
 Mesh grounded lace has motives connected with ground
  too many types to repeat here
  Guipure lace has motifs connected with plaits
 Bedfordshire lace (Beds) – this has flowing lines and picots (to foil the lace machines)
 Cluny lace – has radiating long, thin leaves, called wheatears
 Maltese lace – often has the 8 pointed Maltese cross as part of the pattern 
 Yak lace – made of wool
 Cantu Lace—also called Venetian Pointe lace
 Genoese lace – usually a geometric design
 Part lace
 Honiton lace – very fine English lace with many flowers
 Rosaline Perlée – a mixed lace, but mainly bobbin lace 
 Bruges lace – assembled from leaves scrolls and open flowers
  Brussels lace – Point d'Angleterre, Point plat appliqué, Point Duchesse
  Bobbin tape lace sometimes categorized as part lace (not to be confused with tape lace which uses prefabricated tapes)
 Russian lace
 Idrija lace
 Schneeberg lace – since about 1910 
 Milanese lace
 Hinojosa lace
  Peasant lace

Contemporary laces

The advent of machine-made lace at first pushed lace-makers into more complicated designs beyond the capabilities of early machines, then simpler designs so they could compete on price, and finally pushed them out of business almost entirely.

The resurgence of lace-making is a recent phenomenon and is mostly done as a hobby.  Lacemaking groups still meet in regions as varied as Devonshire, England and Orange County, California. In the European towns where lace was once a major industry, especially in Belgium, England, Spain (Camariñas and Almagro), northern and centre Portugal, France and Slovenia lacemakers still demonstrate the craft and sell their wares, though their customer base has shifted from the wealthy nobility to the curious tourist.

Still new types of lace are being developed such as the 3D Rosalibre and a colored version of Milanese lace by borrowing rolls from Duchesse lace to store various shades and colors. Other artists are giving grounds a major role by distorting and varying stitches, pin distances and thread sizes or colours. The variations are explored by experimentation and mathematics and algorithms. The lace maintaining its shape without stiffening is no longer a requirement. Inspiring journals, guilds and foundations show that old techniques with a new twist can challenge young people to create works that can definitely classify as art.
A Dutch design graduate in 2006 discovered bobbin lace was a technique to make a fancy fence. The first fences became museum pieces. The fences are now produced in Bangalore by concrete rebar plaiters.

Tools

The major tools to make bobbin lace are a pillow, bobbins, pins and prickings.  The part laces also require a crochet hook, very fine types of lace require very fine hooks. There are different types of pillows and bobbins linked to areas, eras and type of lace.

Bobbins
Bobbins, which are traditionally made of wood or bone, are used to hold the thread. They come in different shapes, often associated with certain types of lace. The parts of a bobbin are the neck, which is where the thread is wound, a head, where thread is hitched to keep it from coming unwound, and the shank, which is used as a handle. Bobbins from England may also have a beaded spangle at the end of the shank, which makes the bobbin heavier and helps with tensioning the thread. Bobbins are usually 3 1/2 - 4 inches long, though they may be shorter or longer. Bobbins are wound and used in pairs. Bobbin collection is a common aspect of the hobby for many lace makers. Within the lace community, commemorative bobbins designating annual meetings, special anniversaries, or historic events are frequently offered which become collector's items.

There are many types of bobbins, including:
 Belgian bobbins: They have a single head and a bulbous rounding near the end of the shank that helps with tensioning threads.
 Binche bobbins: The bulbous rounding need the end of the shank is small, making these bobbins good for fine, straight laces.
 East Midlands bobbins: These double-headed bobbins are slender and spangled. They are also called Bucks or Midlands bobbins.
 Honiton bobbins: Honiton bobbins are straight below the single head, and the end of the shank comes to a blunt point, which helps with sewing. They may be called a lace stick.
 Square bobbins: Square bobbins have a shank with flattened sides, which makes it easier to keep them from rolling on the pillow.
 Portuguese bobbins: The bobbin is an elongated pear-shaped wooden artefact where the thread is wrapped.

Types of pillow
The pillows must be firm, or otherwise the pins will wobble. The pillows were traditionally stuffed with straw, but nowadays polystyrene (styrofoam) is generally used.

An early type of pillow can be seen in The Lace Maker by Caspar Netscher. The pillow has a wooden frame, and is slightly sloping. The lace-maker rests it on her lap. Another representation of the similar style of pillow is found in the painting The Lacemaker by Johannes Vermeer. The Lace-Maker portrait by Gabriël Metsu was memorialized in a postage stamp.
 
The bolster or cylindrical pillow was much cheaper to make as it is just a fabric bag stuffed with straw. It was used in Bedfordshire lace. It needs a stand as it does not have a flat bottom. Usually the bolster had the pattern pinned round the cylinder, so by turning the pillow, the lace could be as long as was needed. However, Maltese lacemakers used the pillow the other way. They had a long thin pillow, which they rested against something. Then they worked the lace down the length of the pillow.

This problem (of the lace needing to be longer than the pillow) is solved in a different way by the roller pillow, which has a small roller, for working the lace, set into a larger area, where the bobbins are laid. This means that the pattern can be pinned round the roller, but the pillow has a flat bottom.

The cheapest modern pillow is domed and made of polystyrene (styrofoam). It is often called a cookie pillow, because of its shape. Another modern pillow is a block pillow, with a frame which holds covered polystyrene blocks. The blocks can be moved around as the lace progresses, to keep the lace being worked on at the centre of the pillow.

Lacemaking organizations
Lacemaking is considered a folk art with technique and materials varying widely across the globe. Most lacemakers belong to regional guilds within their country of origin. Guilds can be devoted to one kind of lace, often that which developed locally, or may include makers of all kinds. In the United States, most guilds are organized within chapters of the International Organization of Lace, which also includes Canadian lace guilds. Quarterly publications of "The Bulletin" journal provide articles about current projects and events, historical research, annual meeting details, patterns, and more. Internationally, the Organisation Internationale de la Dentelle au Fuseau et à l'Aiguille (OIDFA, International Bobbin and Needle Lace Organization) is the primary governing and networking body for lacemakers. OIDFA organizes annual global congresses, regional fairs, and local gatherings to promote the appreciation and knowledge of lacemaking.

References

Further reading

External links

 Encajedebolillos.es - Shows 20 different lace styles
 An animation and explanation of various lace stitches